Rich Woodland Jr. (born August 5, 1970) is an American former stock car racing driver. He competed in the NASCAR Winston West Series in the mid 1990s, and also made two starts in NASCAR's premier Winston Cup Series.

Career
Born in Templeton, California, Woodland made his debut in NASCAR competition in the Winston West Series in 1992; he posted three top-ten finishes in six starts in his first year. After two partial seasons in 1993 and 1994, Woodland ran two full years in the series, with a best points finish of fifth in 1995.

Woodland also competed in NASCAR's Winston Cup Series; the series ran combination races between Winston Cup and Winston West at Sears Point Raceway, Phoenix International Raceway, and Indianapolis Motor Speedway (in 1994 only). Woodland successfully qualified for races at Phoenix in 1993 and Sears Point in 1996; his best finish came in the latter event, where he finished 37th of 44 cars in the race. Woodland also attempted but failed to qualify for six other combination races; in 1994 at Sears Point he was involved in a spectacular practice crash, launching his Oldsmobile off the track and destroying it.

Starting with the 1997 season, Woodland shifted his focus from the Winston West Series to the ARCA Racing Series; he would run partial ARCA schedules between 1997 and 2004, with a best finish of fifth at Pikes Peak International Raceway and Pocono Raceway in 1998. Woodland also continued to run selected Winston West races in 1997 and 1998, and in the latter year posted his only Winston West Series win, at Phoenix International Raceway. Woodland started 21st in the event, setting a record for most spots gained in a West Series race to win at the track. As a result of his win, Woodland was selected by NASCAR to compete in the Coca-Cola 500 Winston Cup exhibition race at Twin Ring Motegi in 1998; Woodland finished 31st in the event.

Between 1999 and 2001, Woodland competed in selected NASCAR Craftsman Truck Series races. His best finish in nine races was 14th, at Daytona International Speedway in 2000. Woodland also attempted but failed to qualify for two NASCAR Busch Series races in 2001.

Motorsports career results

NASCAR
(key) (Bold – Pole position awarded by qualifying time. Italics – Pole position earned by points standings or practice time. * – Most laps led.)

Winston Cup Series

Busch Series

Craftsman Truck Series

References

External links
 

Living people
1970 births
People from San Luis Obispo County, California
Racing drivers from California
NASCAR drivers
ARCA Menards Series drivers
NASCAR team owners